As per 2011 census, Faridabad in National Capital Region is the most populous city of Haryana. This is a list of urban agglomerations and cities, not included in urban agglomerations,  with a population above 100,000 as per 2011 census in the Indian state of Haryana:

Urban Agglomeration
In the census of India 2011, an Urban Agglomeration has been defined as follows:

"An urban agglomeration is a continuous urban spread constituting a town and its adjoining outgrowths (OGs), or two or more physically contiguous towns together with or without outgrowths of such towns. An Urban Agglomeration must consist of at least a statutory town and its total population (i.e. all the constituents put together) should not be less than 20,000 as per the 2001 Census. In varying local conditions, there were similar other combinations which have been treated
as urban agglomerations satisfying the basic condition of contiguity."

Constituents of Urban Agglomerations in Haryana
The constituents of Urban Agglomerations in Haryana, with a population of 10 crore or above, are noted below:

 Gurgaon UA includes Gurgaon (M Corp.), Ghata (part) (OG), Daultabad (part) (OG), Naya Behrampur (part) (OG) and Badshahpur (part) (87) (CT).
 Pundri UA includes Pundri (MC), Fatehpur (part) (OG).
 Panipat UA includes Panipat (M Cl), Panipat Taraf Ansar (CT), Panipat Taraf Makhdum Zadgan (CT), Panipat Taraf Rajputan (CT), Sec. 11&12 Part II (CT) and Kabulbag (Part) (OG).
 Yamunanagar UA includes Yamunanagar (M Cl), Jagadhri (M Cl), Sasauli (CT), Pansera (part) (OG) and Kansepur (CT).
 Hisar UA includes Hisar (M Cl) and CCS HAU Campus & Mini Secretariate (OG)
 Karnal UA includes Karnal (M Cl), Phusgarh (part) (OG) and Kailash (part) (OG).
 Sonipat UA includes Sonipat (M Cl), Bandepur (OG), Lahrara (OG) and Fazalpur (81) (CT).
 Ambala UA includes Ambala Sadar (M CL), Ambala (CB), Sarsehri (OG), Babiyal (CT) and Kardhan (CT).
 Palwal UA includes Palwal (M Cl) and Mohannagar (part) (OG).Babiyal

Note: M Corp.= Municipal Corporation; MCL= Municipal Council;  M= Municipality; CT= Census Town; OG= Out Growth; NA= Notified Area; CB= Cantonment Board.

Urban Agglomeration constituents
Urban Agglomerations constituents with a population above 100,000 as per 2011 census are shown in the table below.

References

 
Cities